Richie Ramsay (born 15 June 1983) is a Scottish professional golfer who plays on the European Tour.

Ramsay played in the 2005 Walker Cup and, in 2006, became the first British golfer in almost a century to win the U.S. Amateur.

Ramsay turned professional in 2007, and played two seasons on the second tier Challenge Tour, winning twice in 2008. He has played on the European Tour since 2009, winning three times.

Personal life
Ramsay was born in Aberdeen. He is an honorary member of Royal Aberdeen Golf Club and was a student at Stirling University in Scotland, where he graduated in 2007.

Amateur career
Ramsay won the Scottish Amateur Open Stroke Play Championship in 2004, and the Irish Amateur Open Championship in 2005. He went on to represent Great Britain & Ireland in the Walker Cup later that year.

In 2006, Ramsay won the U.S. Amateur, defeating American John Kelly 4 & 2 in the 36-hole final. He was the first British player to win the championship since 1911, and the first Scot since 1898. He topped the first edition of the World Amateur Golf Ranking, which was issued by the R&A on 23 January 2007.

After playing in the 2007 Masters Tournament, U.S. Open and Open Championship, for which he had qualified through his U.S. Amateur victory, Ramsay turned professional.

Professional career
Ramsay made his professional debut in August 2007 at the European Tour's Russian Open. He finished that event in a tie for 53rd place, and completed the remainder of the season playing tournaments on the second tier Challenge Tour. Having failed to come through final qualifying school at the end of the season, he again played on the Challenge Tour in 2008. He won his first professional tournaments during the 2008 season, the Vodafone Challenge in Germany and the AGF-Allianz Golf Open Grand Toulouse. He ended the year in 8th place on the Challenge Tour Rankings to graduate directly to the European Tour for 2009.

In 2009, Ramsay finished the season inside the top 100 of the Race to Dubai and secured his tour card for 2010. At the second event of the 2010 season, held at the end of 2009, he won his first title on the European Tour by defeating Shiv Kapur in a playoff for the South African Open Championship.

By 2011, Ramsay was firmly established on the European Tour with 6 top ten finishes taking him to the top 30 of the Order of Merit for the first time.

In September 2012, Ramsay won the Omega European Masters in Crans-Montana, Switzerland. He shot a final-round 66 to win by four shots. The following month Ramsay finished runner-up at the Hero Indian Open on the Asian Tour. He was defeated in a sudden-death playoff by Thaworn Wiratchant.

In March 2015, Ramsay won the Trophée Hassan II, winning by one shot over Romain Wattel and claiming his third European Tour victory.

In July 2022, Ramsay won the Cazoo Classic at Hillside Golf Club. He shot a final-round 69 to win by one shot over Paul Waring. It was his first victory in over 7 years.

Amateur wins
2004 Scottish Amateur Open Stroke Play Championship
2005 Irish Amateur Open Championship
2006 U.S. Amateur

Professional wins (6)

European Tour wins (4)

1Co-sanctioned by the Sunshine Tour
2Co-sanctioned by the Asian Tour

European Tour playoff record (1–0)

Asian Tour wins (1)

1Co-sanctioned by the European Tour

Asian Tour playoff record (0–1)

Sunshine Tour wins (1)

1Co-sanctioned by the European Tour

Sunshine Tour playoff record (1–0)

Challenge Tour wins (2)

Results in major championships

CUT = missed the half-way cut
"T" indicates a tie for a place

Summary

Most consecutive cuts made – 1 (three times)
Longest streak of top-10s – 0

Results in World Golf Championships
Results not in chronological order before 2015.

QF, R16, R32, R64 = Round in which player lost in match play
"T" = Tied

Team appearances
Amateur
European Boys' Team Championship (representing Scotland): 2001
European Youths' Team Championship (representing Scotland): 2004 (winners)
European Amateur Team Championship (representing Scotland): 2005, 2007
Walker Cup (representing Great Britain & Ireland): 2005
Eisenhower Trophy (representing Scotland): 2006
St Andrews Trophy (representing Great Britain & Ireland): 2006 (winners)
Bonallack Trophy (representing Europe): 2006 (winners)
Palmer Cup (representing Europe): 2006 (winners)

See also
2008 Challenge Tour graduates

References

External links

Scottish male golfers
European Tour golfers
People educated at Hazlehead Academy
Alumni of the University of Stirling
Sportspeople from Aberdeen
1983 births
Living people